Achna is an abandoned village in the Famagusta District of Cyprus. It is just north of the Buffer Zone and it is under the de facto control of Northern Cyprus. After the 1974 Turkish invasion, its displaced inhabitants built a new village nearby.

Achna is known for its football club, Ethnikos Achna FC. Ethnikos Achna won the UEFA Intertoto Cup in 2006.

New village
The inhabitants of Achna built a provisional tent village in the Achna forest (Dasaki tis Achnas), some hundred meters (yards) away from their old village, and later started to build a new village, Dasaki Achnas, near the old location, within the confines of the Dhekelia Sovereign Base Area.

Dasaki Achnas' population in 2011 was 2,087.

Gallery

References 

Communities in Famagusta District
Populated places in Gazimağusa District
Greek Cypriot villages depopulated during the 1974 Turkish invasion of Cyprus
Former populated places in Cyprus